In Your Own Sweet Time is the fifth studio album by Scottish rock band, The Fratellis. The album was released on 16 March 2018. As well as being released on the standard formats of CD, digital download and vinyl, the band also released a limited edition orange vinyl and cassette available from their official online store.

Background and recording
After touring the 10th anniversary of their debut album Costello Music, the band started work on their fifth studio album. They flew out to Los Angeles for six weeks to reunite with their producer (Tony Hoffer), who also produced their previous album Eyes Wide, Tongue Tied, as well as Jon's solo Psycho Jukebox. Taking with them only 12 songs, the fewest they have taken to record with, the band eventually returned home to play shows over the summer period, before announcing the album in November 2017, with a March 2018 release date. For unknown reasons, the album was pushed back a week from 9 March to 16 March.

Track listing

Personnel

The Fratellis
 Jon Fratelli – vocals, guitars, keyboards
 Barry Fratelli – bass
 Mince Fratelli – drums, percussion

Additional musicians
 Stevie Black – strings , esraj 
 Tony Hoffer – production, mixing, additional keyboards 

Production
 Will Foster – orchestral score 
 Cameron Lister – engineering
 Dave Cooley – mastering

Design
 Ben Brown – cover art
 Jamie Farrell – design

Charts

References

External links
 Official site

2018 albums
The Fratellis albums
Albums produced by Tony Hoffer